The Northern Football Alliance is a football league based in the North East, England. It has four divisions headed by the Premier Division, which sits at step 7 (or level 11) of the National League System.

The top club in the Premier Division is eligible for promotion to the Northern League Division Two. The top clubs in the First, Second and Third Divisions are promoted to the Premier, First, and Second Divisions respectively. The bottom club in the Third Division may be relegated to either the North Northumberland League Division One, or the Tyneside Amateur League, depending on which is more geographically appropriate.

The Northern Football Alliance was founded in 1890 as a single league, with a membership of seven teams. In 1926 it became the Second Division of the North Eastern League, but it split away again in 1935. It disbanded in 1964 due to lack of membership, but reformed just one season later, in 1965–66.

In 1988 the Northern Amateur League and the Northern Combination League combined with the Northern Football Alliance (all under the name Northern Football Alliance) to create a three-division format, which later expanded to four. Under a sponsorship agreement it is billed as the Bay Plastics Northern Football Alliance.

The league's teams chiefly come from Tyneside as well as Northumberland, with teams from further south preferring to play in the Wearside League, but there are exceptions, for example Prudhoe Town F.C. from Northumberland compete in the Wearside League, whilst Coundon and Leeholme from near Bishop Auckland in southern County Durham compete in the Alliance.

Member teams, 2022–23 season

Premier Division
AFC Newbiggin
Alnwick Town
Burradon & New Fordley
Cramlington United
Gateshead Rutherford
Halwhistle Jubilee
Killingworth
Newcastle Blue Star
Newcastle Chemfica
Newcastle Independent
Percy Main Amateurs
Ponteland United
Seaton Delaval AFC
Wallington
Whitley Bay 'A'
Winlaton Community

Division One
Bedlington
FC United of Newcastle
Forest Hall
Gosforth Bohemians
Hebburn Town U23
Hexham
Newcastle Blue Star Reserves
Newcastle East End
North Shields Athletic
Rothbury
Seaton Burn
Stobswood Welfare
Wallsend Boys Club
West Moor & Jesmond
Whitburn & Cleadon
Willington Quay Saints

Division Two
Blaydon Community
Blyth Town U23
Cullercoats
Ellington
Heaton Stannington 'A'
Morpeth
Newcastle Chemfica Amateurs
Newcastle Independent Cabrito
Newcastle University 'A'
North Sunderland
Ponteland United Reserves
Red House Farm
Seaton Sluice
Walker Central
Whitley Bay Sporting Club
Wideopen

Division Three
Amble AFC
Alnwick Town Development
Ashington AFC Reserves
Benton
Blyth Rangers
Cramlington Blue Star
Gateshead Redheugh 1957
Gosforth Bohemians Reserves
Hazlerigg Victory
Heddon United
Stocksfield
Wallsend Boys Club U23
West Moor & Jesmond U23
Whickham U23
Whitley Bay Sporting Club 'A'

Champions (1890–1988)

1890–91 – Sunderland "A"
1891–92 – Shankhouse
1892–93 – Sunderland "A"
1893–94 – Sunderland "A"
1894–95 – Sunderland "A"
1895–96 – Sunderland "A"
1896–97 – Hebburn Argyle
1897–98 – Newcastle United "A"
1898–99 – Jarrow
1899–1900 – Willington Athletic
1900–01 – Newcastle United "A"
1901–02 – Newcastle United "A"
1902–03 – Morpeth Harriers
1903–04 – Wallsend Park Villa 	
1904–05 – Willington Athletic
1905–06 – Willington Athletic
1906–07 – North Shields Athletic
1907–08 – North Shields Athletic
1908–09 – Blyth Spartans
1909–10 – Willington Athletic
1910–11 – Newburn
1911–12 – Newburn
1912–13 – Blyth Spartans
1913–14 – Ashington
1914–15 – Spen Black & Whites
1915–19 – Not competed for due to World War I
1919–20 – Annfield Plain
1920–21 – Chopwell Institute
1921–22 – Felling Colliery
1922–23 – Annfield Plain
1923–24 – Birtley
1924–25 – Ashington Reserves
1925–26 – Chilton Colliery Recreation
1926–27 – Consett
1927–28 – Washington Colliery
1928–29 – North Shields
1929–30 – Walker Celtic
1930–31 – Chopwell Institute
1931–32 – Crawcrook Albion
1932–33 – Eden Colliery Welfare
1933–34 – Throckley Welfare
1934–35 – Newbiggin West End
1935–36 – Hexham Town
1936–37 – Stakeford Albion
1937–38 – Alnwick

1938–39 – Newcastle United "A"
1939–46 – Not competed for due to World War II
1946–47 – Newburn
1947–48 – Hexham Hearts
1948–49 – Cramlington Welfare
1949–50 – West Sleekburn
1950–51 – Cramlington Welfare
1951–52 – Newburn
1952–53 – Whitley Bay Athletic
1953–54 – Whitley Bay Athletic
1954–55 – Amble
1955–56 – Ashington Reserves
1956–57 – Amble
1957–58 – Newcastle United "A"
1958–59 – Amble
1959–60 – Amble
1960–61 – Amble
1961–62 – Newburn
1962–63 – Alnwick Town
1963–64 – Alnwick Town
1964–65 – not competed
1965–66 – Alnwick Town
1966–67 – Bedlington Colliery Welfare
1967–68 – Alnwick Town
1968–69 – Alnwick Town
1969–70 – Alnwick Town
1970–71 – Alnwick Town
1971–72 – Alnwick Town
1972–73 – Marine Park
1973–74 – Marine Park
1974–75 – South Shields Mariners
1975–76 – South Shields
1976–77 – Wallington
1977–78 – Brandon United
1978–79 – Brandon United
1979–80 – Guisborough Town
1980–81 – Percy Main Amateurs
1981–82 – Percy Main Amateurs
1982–83 – Darlington Cleveland Bridge
1983–84 – Morpeth Town
1984–85 – Dudley Welfare
1985–86 – Gateshead Tyne Sports
1986–87 – West Allotment Celtic
1987–88 – Seaton Delaval Seaton Terrace

Divisional Champions (Since 1988)

References

External links
Official website
Full-Time at The FA

 
Football leagues in England
1890 establishments in England
Sports leagues established in 1890